Sofía Oria (Madrid, Spain; born June 8, 2002) is a Spanish actress known for playing Carmencita in the Goya-winning film Blancanieves and Carmen in the Movistar+ series Gigantes.

Biography 
Sofía Oria was born on June 8, 2002 in Madrid, Spain. She took acting classes with Nuria Soler, and after completing her high school studies, she began studying psychology and criminology.

Trajectory 
Shortly after her tenth birthday, she participated in the Goya-winning film Blancanieves in 2012, playing Carmencita. That same year, she also participated in the film Invasor, directed by Daniel Calparsoro. In 2015, she joined the cast of the Telecinco blockbuster Las aventuras del Capitán Alatriste, which was filmed in 2013 and in which she played Dorotea. After taking a few years off to focus on her studies, she returned to the world of acting in 2018 with the Movistar+ series Gigantes.

In 2020, she appeared as a supporting actress in Caronte, where she played Irene, and Mentiras, where she played Amal. A year later, she played Reina in the Movistar+ series Libertad. In addition, she premiered the film Mamá o papá, alongside Paco León and Miren Ibarguren, directed by Dani de la Orden. Her leading role was also announced for the film ¡Mamá está en las redes!, directed by Daniela Fejerman.

Filmography

Cinema

Television

References 

Spanish television actresses
Spanish film actresses
Living people
2002 births
21st-century Spanish actresses
Actresses from Madrid